The Russell and Pearl Soderling House, in Bonners Ferry in Boundary County, Idaho, was built in 1938.  It was listed on the National Register of Historic Places in 1998.

It is a one-story frame house on a poured concrete foundation.  Its NRHP nomination describes it as "an eclectic interpretation of the Minimal-Traditional style which gained great popularity during the 1930s."

References

Houses on the National Register of Historic Places in Idaho
Houses completed in 1938
Buildings and structures in Boundary County, Idaho
1938 establishments in Idaho